Forrest George "Fod" Cotton (January 14, 1901 – March 6, 1967) was an American football player and coach of football and basketball. Cotton played college football at the University of Notre Dame.

References

External links
 

1901 births
1967 deaths
American football tackles
Basketball coaches from Illinois
Catholic University Cardinals football coaches
Catholic University Cardinals men's basketball coaches
Notre Dame Fighting Irish football players
Rock Island Independents players
St. Ambrose Fighting Bees football coaches
St. Ambrose Fighting Bees men's basketball coaches
Sportspeople from Elgin, Illinois
Players of American football from Illinois